William Henry Boaz (July 21, 1852 – March 9, 1907) was an American politician who served in the Virginia House of Delegates.

References

External links 

1852 births
1907 deaths
Democratic Party members of the Virginia House of Delegates
19th-century American politicians
20th-century American politicians